Ramėnai (formerly ) is a village in Kėdainiai district municipality, in Kaunas County, in central Lithuania. According to the 2011 census, the village has a population of 3 people. It is located 1.5 km from Vaidatoniai, by the Alkas river.

History
The village is known since 1372, when it was under the Teutonic Order ride. Since 1591 Ramėnai manor is mentioned.

Demography

References

Villages in Kaunas County
Kėdainiai District Municipality